Billy Morrison (?–?) was a Scottish footballer who played for Fulham between 1904 and 1908, making 142 appearances and scoring nine goals for the club in all competitions.

Fulham F.C. players
English Football League players
Association football defenders
Scottish footballers